Martin Lee Parkinson  (born 26 September 1958) is a senior Australian public servant. He was Secretary of the Department of the Treasury between March 2011 and December 2014. On 3 December 2015 it was announced that he would return to the public service as Secretary of the Department of Prime Minister and Cabinet. He retired from the position on 30 August 2019 and was replaced by Phil Gaetjens, former chief of staff to Prime Minister Scott Morrison. Parkinson has served as the Chancellor of Macquarie University since 2019.

Life and career
Parkinson graduated with honours from the University of Adelaide with a Bachelor of Economics. He completed his master's degree in economics at the Australian National University in 1983 and his Master of Arts in 1988, also at the Australian National University. He completed his Ph.D in 1990 at Princeton University.

Parkinson has previously served as the inaugural secretary of the Department of Climate Change, deputy secretary of the Department of the Treasury, an International Monetary Fund official, and an advisor to former Australian Treasurer, John Dawkins.

Between 2011 and 2015, Parkinson was secretary of the Department of the Treasury.

In late October 2019, Parkinson was elected chancellor at Macquarie University.

Awards
Parkinson was awarded the Public Service Medal on 26 January 2008. He was also a recipient of the inaugural Australian National University Alumnus of the Year Award on 9 March 2013. In 2017 Parkinson was appointed a Companion of the Order of Australia for eminent service to the Australian community through leadership in public sector roles, to innovative government administration and high level program delivery, to the development of economic policy, and to climate change strategy.

Notes

References

1958 births
Living people
University of Adelaide alumni
Australian National University alumni
Princeton University alumni
Secretaries of the Department of the Treasury of Australia
Companions of the Order of Australia
Recipients of the Public Service Medal (Australia)
Chancellors of Macquarie University